Storage may refer to:

Goods

Containers
 Dry cask storage, for storing high-level radioactive waste
 Food storage
 Intermodal container, cargo shipping
 Storage tank

Facilities
 Garage (residential), a storage space normally used to store cars
 Mail storage, storage by mail or delivery service
 Self storage, a public storage facility
 Warehouse, a commercial building for storage of goods

Technology
Cloud storage
Computer data storage, a means to retain digital data
Data storage, general recording and retention of information
Energy storage
Specific storage, of groundwater in an aquifer

Arts and entertainment 
 Storage (film), a 2009 Australian horror film
 The Storage, a 2011 Finnish film
 Storage (album), a 1988 album by Merzbow
 Storage Wars, a reality television show
 "Storage Wars", an episode of One Day at a Time (2017 TV series)

Other
 Storage (memory), a psychological and physiological process

See also
 
 
 Container (disambiguation)
 Inventory (disambiguation)
 Store (disambiguation)
 Archive